Commins Aston Mewa (born April 11, 1965 in Uta, Santa Cruz, Temotu Province) is a Solomon Islands politician.

He worked as a chief education officer before going into politics. His career in national politics began when he was elected to Parliament as the member for Temotu Nende in the August 2010 general election, standing as an independent candidate. He was then appointed Minister for Justice and Legal Affairs in Prime Minister Danny Philip's Cabinet. When Gordon Darcy Lilo replaced Philip as Prime Minister in November 2011, Mewa retained his position in government.

On 15 December 2014, following a general election, Mewa was appointed Minister for Communication and Aviation by new Prime Minister Manasseh Sogavare. On 5 December 2017, appointed Minister for Home Affairs by PM Rick Houenipwela.

Elected for the Kadere Party in the 2019 Solomon Islands general election.

References

1965 births
Living people
Members of the National Parliament of the Solomon Islands
People from Temotu Province
Communication ministers of the Solomon Islands
Interior ministers of the Solomon Islands